Alto Alegre dos Parecis is a municipality located in the Brazilian state of Rondônia. Its population was 13,255 (2020) and its area is 3,958 km².

The municipality contains 20% of the  Corumbiara State Park, created in 1990.
It also contained the  Serra dos Parecis State Park, created in 1990 and cancelled in 2010.

References

Municipalities in Rondônia